Spacetoon India is an Indian media and licensing company. It was established in 2006. Spacetoon has more than 70 licensing deals, including for Crayon Shin-chan, Doraemon and Hello Kitty. The company also creates original intellectual property, including Fafa & Juno.

In November 2005, Spacetoon partnered with Sahara One to create Spacetoon Hour, an hour-long broadcast of animated and live action series culled from SpaceToon Media Group's library. The broadcast was later cancelled.

In 2009, Spacetoon launched a free-to-air channel in India. Broadcasting was later discontinued. Spacetoon has sister channels in the Arab world and in Indonesia.

Spacetoon India programmes
The following shows were broadcast on Spacetoon India:
Action Man
Auto Cat (Cyborg Kuro Chan)
DOKI
Horrid Henry
Bump in the Night
Enchanted Princess Party
The Great Book of Nature
Hello Kitty
Incredible Dennis
Inspector Fabre
Inspector Gadget's Field Trip
Little Clowns of Happytown
Lost Universe
OffSide
Plusters
Ryukendo
Fafa & Juno
Sailor Moon
Sherlock Holmes
Sally Bollywood
Simba, The King Lion
Sonic the Hedgehog
Super Litte Fanta Heroes
Toy Toons
Wild West Cow Boys of Moo Mesa
Willow Town
Nobody's Girl Remi
Shin Hakkenden
Hunter x Hunter
Baby & Me
Devilman
Deathnote

Planets
The Spacetoon Planet 8 In Below -----

Comedy Planet
SpongeBob SquarePants
Woody Woodpecker
Baby Looney Tunes
The Tom and Jerry Show
Alvinnn!!! and the Chipmunks
The Mr. Men Show
The Simpsons
The Garfield Show
Angry Birds Toons
Doraemon
Shaun the Sheep
Sunny Bunnies
Pink Panther
The Pink Panther
The Pink Panther Show
The Loud House
The Rubbish World of Dave Spud
The High Fructose Adventures of Annoying Orange

Zumorroda Planet
’’Barbie Dreamtopia’’
’’Barbie: Dreamhouse Adventures’’
’’Kids Diana Show’’
’’Hello Kitty’’
’’Hello Kitty and Friends Let's Learn Together’’
’’Masha and the Bear’’
’’PINY: Institute of New York’’
’’Dora and Friends’’
’’My Little Pony: Friendship is Magic’’
’’My Little Pony: Pony Life’’
’’Littlest Pet Shop’’
’’Trulli Tales’’
’’Nella the Princess Knight’’
’’Smarta and her Magic Bag’’

Bon Bon Planet
’’Thomas and Friends’’
’’Fireman Sam’’
’’Bob the Builder’’
’’Little People’’
’’Peppa Pig’’
’’In the Night Garden’’
’’Mickey Mouse Clubhouse’’
’’Teletubbies’’
’’Hey Duggee’’
’’Cocomelon’’
’’Super Simple Songs’’
’’Twirlywoos’’
’’Postman Pat’’
’’Bubble Guppies’’
’’Ben and Holly's Little Kingdom’’
’’The Care Bears Family’’
’’LazyTown’’

Abjad Planet
’’MIA the Mouse’’
’’Barney & Friends’’
’’Teletubbies’’
’’Jim Henson's Animal Show’’
’’Pocoyo’’
’’The Hoobs’’

Action Planet
’’Pokémon Diamond and Pearl’’
’’Pokémon: Indigo League’’
’’Power Rangers’’
’’PJ Masks’’
’’Monster Hunter’’
’’Dragon Ball Super’’
’’Naruto Shippuden’’

Adventure Planet
’’Space Ranger Roger’’
’’Hunter X Hunter’’
’’Everything's Rosie (TV series)’’
’’Garfield and Friends’’
’’Octonauts’’
’’Ricky Zoom’’
’’Super Mario World’’
’’Mickey Mouse Clubhouse’’
’’Mike the Knight’’

Sports Planet
’’Inazuma Eleven’’

Movies Planet
’’Despicable Me’’
’’Despicable Me 2’’
’’Curious George (2006 film)’’
’’Flushed Away’’
’’Ice Age (2002 film)’’
’’Ice Age 2: The Meltdown’’
’’Ice Age 3: Dawn of the Dinosaurs’’
’’Ice Age 4: Continental Drift’’
’’Madagascar (2005 film)’’
’’Madagascar: Escape 2 Africa’’
’’Madagascar 3: Europe's Most Wanted’’
’’Louie and the Rainbow Fairy’’
’’Dr. Seuss' Horton Hears a Who’’
’’Curious George 2: Follow That Monkey!’’

References

India
Entertainment companies of India
Anime in India